Kettles or Kettle's may refer to:

Places 
The Kettles, a chain of four small alpine glacial lakes in Custer County, Idaho
Hell Kettles, a spring-fed body of water in County Durham, England
Kettles-de-Berry Ecological Reserve, ecological reserve in Quebec, Canada

Fiction 
The Kettles; See Ma and Pa Kettle
The Kettles in the Ozarks, a 1956 American comedy film
The Kettles on Old MacDonald's Farm, a 1957 American comedy film

Other 
Charles Kettles (1930–2019), United States military officer and recipient of the Medal of Honor
Kettle's Yard, art gallery and house in Cambridge, England
Kettle Foods, Oregon-based snack manufacturer
Kettles (Australian brand), snack foods made by Snack Brands Australia
Two Kettles, a subdivision of the Lakota Sioux tribe

See also
Kettle (disambiguation)